The Emīls Dārziņš Music School (Emīla Dārziņa mūzikas vidusskola) is the junior music conservatory in located in the Āgenskalns district of Riga, named after Emīls Dārziņš. The senior school is the Jāzeps Vītols Latvian Academy of Music (VLMA), formerly Riga Conservatory.

References

Music organisations based in Latvia
Schools in Latvia
Education in Riga